Ternovka is a meteorite crater in Ukraine (Dnipropetrovsk Oblast).

It is 11 km in diameter and the age is estimated to be 280 ± 10 million years (Permian). The crater is not exposed at the surface.

References 

Impact craters of Ukraine
Permian impact craters
Geography of Dnipropetrovsk Oblast
Geography of Kryvyi Rih